Sir John Victor Thomas Woolrych Tait Perowne  (30 July 1897 – 8 January 1951) was a British diplomat.

Career
The son of Edith Marione (née Browne) and John Thomas Woolrych Perowne who married in 1896, John Victor Thomas Woolrych Tait Perowne was educated at Eton College and Corpus Christi College, Cambridge. He served in the Scots Guards 1916–18 with the rank of lieutenant, and contributed a poem "A Dirge" to The Muse in Arms, an anthology of British war poetry.

Perowne joined the Diplomatic Service and served in Madrid, Lisbon, Copenhagen and Paris as well as posts in the Foreign Office before being appointed Envoy Extraordinary and Minister Plenipotentiary to the Holy See in 1947. He died in office in Rome in 1951.

Victor Perowne was appointed CMG in 1944 and knighted KCMG in 1950.

Personal life

Victor Perowne listed his recreations in Who's Who as "Art, music, literature". He married the Hon. Agatha Beaumont, youngest daughter of Wentworth Beaumont, 1st Viscount Allendale, in 1933; they had one son.

See also
British Ambassadors to the Holy See

External links

References
 PEROWNE, Sir John Victor Thomas Woolrych Tait, Who Was Who, A & C Black, 1920–2008; online edn, Oxford University Press, Dec 2007, accessed 19 March 2012
 Sir Victor Perowne, photo in "UK in Holy See's photostream" on flickr.com

1897 births
1951 deaths
People educated at Eton College
Alumni of Corpus Christi College, Cambridge
Ambassadors of the United Kingdom to the Holy See
Knights Commander of the Order of St Michael and St George
Knights of the Order of St John
Fellows of the Society of Antiquaries of London
Burials in the Protestant Cemetery, Rome